Granite Falls Township is a township in Chippewa County, Minnesota, United States. The population was 222 at the 2000 census.

History
Granite Falls Township was organized in 1890, and named from the rock formations at the falls on the Minnesota River.

Geography

Demographics
As of the census of 2000, there were 222 people, 88 households, and 68 families residing in the township.  The population density was 7.1 people per square mile (2.7/km2).  There were 95 housing units at an average density of 3.0/sq mi (1.2/km2).  The racial makeup of the township was 95.95% White, 0.45% African American, 2.70% Native American, 0.45% Asian, and 0.45% from two or more races.

There were 88 households, out of which 26.1% had children under the age of 18 living with them, 75.0% were married couples living together, 2.3% had a female householder with no husband present, and 21.6% were non-families. 19.3% of all households were made up of individuals, and 9.1% had someone living alone who was 65 years of age or older.  The average household size was 2.52 and the average family size was 2.83.

In the township the population was spread out, with 23.4% under the age of 18, 3.2% from 18 to 24, 28.4% from 25 to 44, 25.2% from 45 to 64, and 19.8% who were 65 years of age or older.  The median age was 42 years. For every 100 females, there were 122.0 males.  For every 100 females age 18 and over, there were 117.9 males.

The median income for a household in the township was $32,273, and the median income for a family was $54,167. Males had a median income of $37,500 versus $26,250 for females. The per capita income for the township was $20,762.  About 4.0% of families and 7.0% of the population were below the poverty line, including none of those under the age of eighteen and 9.1% of those 65 or over.

References

Townships in Chippewa County, Minnesota
Townships in Minnesota